Edward of England may refer to the following monarchs of England and later the United Kingdom:

 Edward the Elder (–924), King of the Anglo-Saxons from 899
 Edward the Martyr (–978), King of the English from 975
 Edward the Confessor (–1066), King of the English from 1042
 Edward I of England (1239–1307), King of England from 1272
 Edward II of England (1284–1327), King of England from 1307 to 1327
 Edward III of England (1312–1377), King of England from 1327
 Edward IV of England (1442–1483), King of England from 1461 to 1470 and from 1471
 Edward V of England (1470–), King of England in 1483, one of the Princes in the Tower
 Edward VI (1537–1553), King of England from 1547
 Edward VII (1841–1910), King of the United Kingdom from 1901
 Edward VIII (1894–1972), King of the United Kingdom in 1936

See also
 Edward of Middleham, Prince of Wales (1473–1484), son of Richard III of England
 Edward of Westminster, Prince of Wales (1453–1471), son of Henry VI of England
 Edward the Black Prince (1330–1376), son of Edward III
 Edward the Exile (1016–1057), son of King Edmund Ironside
 King Edward (disambiguation)
 Prince Edward (disambiguation)